Stanisław Błeszyński (13 August 1927 – 24 December 1969) was a Polish entomologist and lepidopterist specializing in Crambidae, the grass moths.

Błeszyński worked at the Institute of Systematics and Evolution of Animals of the Polish Academy of Sciences beginning in 1945. He headed the Laboratory of Insects (later Laboratory of Invertebrates) there from 1958 until 1967. He then moved to Germany, where he worked at the Zoologisches Forschungsinstitut und Museum Alexander Koenig in Bonn.

References

1927 births
1969 deaths
Polish entomologists
Polish lepidopterists
20th-century Polish zoologists